Osmia taurus is a species of bee in the family Megachilidae. It is found in North America and Southern Asia.

References

Further reading

External links

 

taurus
Articles created by Qbugbot
Insects described in 1873